Antsirabe may mean several places in Madagascar:
 Antsirabe, a large city and urban district, the capital of Vakinankaratra Region.
 Antsirabe I District, the urban district where the city of Antsirabe is located.
 Antsirabe II District, a rural district surrounding the city of Antsirabe.
 Antsirabe, Ambanja, a town and commune in Ambanja District, Diana Region.
 Antsirabe Nord (Antsirabe Avaratra), a town and commune in Vohemar District, Sava Region.
 Antsirabe Afovoany, a town and commune in Mandritsara District, Sofia Region.
 Antsirabe Sahatany, a town and commune in Maroantsetra District, Analanjirofo Region.